Lala is a Bantu language of South Africa, claimed to be extinct in some sources. As of 1999, however, there were still a number of communities of speakers in the coastal regions of the KwaZulu-Natal province of South Africa. Although it is a Tekela Nguni language, for sociological reasons it is often considered a dialect of Zulu (a Zunda Nguni language), whereas it differs quite markedly in phonology and to a degree in morphology, and with a large portion of its lexicon derived from Xhosa (because of Xhosa-medium schooling in the old Natal South Coast) and the IsiZansi Tekela variety of the lower South Coast.

References 

Languages of South Africa
Nguni languages
Endangered Niger–Congo languages